The Rescue Hook & Ladder Company No. 1 Firehouse is a historic fire station located in Roslyn, Nassau County, New York. Although the department was established on November 1, 1852, the Colonial Revival style firehouse itself was built in 1937. It was subsequently sold and renovated as a Temple, and now houses a retail business. 

The new Roslyn Hook & Ladder Company No. 1 firehouse, dedicated in 1986,  is a Brobdingnagian structure containing five fire trucks and larger equipment, towering over the Roslyn Plaza, which had fallen victim to the Town of North Hempstead's asphalt- and concrete- philosophy, demolishing 19th century structures for the Long Island Railroad's expansive parking lot.  The volunteer firefighter brigade has claimed several championships over the years in competitions with other firehouses.

It was added to the National Register of Historic Places on May 6, 1991.

See also
National Register of Historic Places listings in North Hempstead (town), New York

References

External links

Roslyn Rescue (Official Site)
Roslyn Volunteer Fire Department (Roslyn Village)

Colonial Revival architecture in New York (state)
Fire stations completed in 1937
Government buildings completed in 1937
National Register of Historic Places in North Hempstead (town), New York
Fire stations on the National Register of Historic Places in New York (state)
Buildings and structures in Nassau County, New York
Defunct fire stations in New York (state)
1937 establishments in New York (state)